Lianhua North station is a station on Line 4 of the Shenzhen Metro. It opened with the extension of Line 4 on 16 June 2011.

Station layout

Exits

References

External links
 Shenzhen Metro Lianhua North Station (Chinese)
 Shenzhen Metro Lianhua North Station (English)

Railway stations in Guangdong
Shenzhen Metro stations
Futian District
Railway stations in China opened in 2011